Jeremiah Alfred Le Coney (November 3, 1901 – November 11, 1959) was an American athlete, winner of the gold medal in the 4x100 meter relay race at the 1924 Summer Olympics.

Le Coney was raised in Moorestown, New Jersey, where he first started showing his ability as a sprinter at Moorestown High School. In 1922, Le Coney won the AAU championships in the 220 yard race and, as a Lafayette College (Class of 1923) student, the IC4A championships in both the 100 and 220 yard races.

At the 1924 Summer Olympics in Paris, Al Le Coney ran the anchor leg for the American 4x100 meter relay team which won the gold medal with a world record time of 41.0 seconds.

After the Olympics, Le Coney covered the 100 yard distance in 9.4 seconds, but the effort was later disallowed when judges ruled that the time was wind-aided. In 1932, Le Coney received an unusual honor when a picture of him at the 1924 Olympics was used by the U.S. Post Office in developing a commemorative stamp.

References

1901 births
1959 deaths
American male sprinters
Athletes (track and field) at the 1924 Summer Olympics
Lafayette College alumni
Moorestown High School alumni
Olympic gold medalists for the United States in track and field
People from Moorestown, New Jersey
Track and field athletes from New Jersey
Medalists at the 1924 Summer Olympics
Sportspeople from Burlington County, New Jersey